Mother Mary Angelica of the Annunciation  (born Rita Antoinette Rizzo; April 20, 1923 – March 27, 2016), also known as Mother Angelica, was an American Roman Catholic nun of the Poor Clares of Perpetual Adoration.  She was best known for the television show Mother Angelica Live. She was the founder of the international broadcast cable television network Eternal Word Television Network (EWTN) and the radio network WEWN. EWTN became a voice for Catholics worldwide.

In 1981, Angelica started broadcasting religious programs from a converted garage in Birmingham, Alabama. Over the next twenty years, she developed a media network that included radio, TV, and internet channels as well as print media. Angelica hosted shows on EWTN until she had a stroke in 2001. She continued to live in the cloistered monastery in Hanceville, Alabama, until her death in 2016.

Early life 
Mother Angelica was born Rita Antoinette Rizzo on April 20, 1923, in Canton, Ohio, in a community of African-American and Italian immigrant mill workers. Of Italian-American background, from Capriati a Volturno, Campania. She was the only child of John and Mae Helen Rizzo (née Gianfrancesco). Her father, a tailor by trade, abandoned the family when Rizzo was only five, and her parents divorced two years later. On March 10, 1931, her mother was granted custody of the young Rizzo, and her father was ordered to pay five dollars a week in child support. Her mother only received "intermittent child-support payments from the father." While maintaining full custody, her mother struggled with chronic depression and poverty. This was in part because being a divorcée carried a social stigma at the time and the opportunities for a woman to secure income were limited especially in the height of the Great Depression.

Looking back at her childhood, Angelica described herself and her mother as being "like a pair of refugees." "We were poor, hungry, and barely surviving on odd jobs until Mother joined the dry cleaning business as an apprentice to a Jewish tailor in our area. Even then, we pinched pennies just to keep food on the table." The pair lived with her maternal grandparents, moving out for a time between 1933 and 1937, but were forced to return because of financial pressures. Matters were complicated when her grandfather, Anthony Gianfrancesco, suffered a stroke in their absence, which paralyzed him on one side and required him to use a cane.

Education
Rizzo attended a parochial school, but disliked the nuns there, whom she recalled as being "the meanest people on earth" and treating her with harsh discipline due to her parents' divorce. She then attended Canton's McKinley High School, where she was one of the school's first drum majorettes. She later told an interviewer, "I did very poorly in school. I wasn't interested in the capital of Ohio. I was interested in whether my mother had committed suicide that day." Rizzo developed no intimate friendships in high school, partly because of her fear that it would further upset her mother, who saw other demands for attention as a threat. Rizzo never dated, recalling later, "I never had a date, never wanted one. I just didn't have any desire. I suppose having experienced the worst of married life, it was not at all attractive to me."

In 1939, Rizzo, feeling overwhelmed by crowd noise and school chatter, began to leave McKinley High in the afternoons. She was given calcium and nerve medication to treat what was deemed a nervous condition. When her mother's mental condition seemed to worsen, she made arrangements with her grandparents to have her sent to Philadelphia to be with a relative. Rizzo graduated from McKinley High School in 1941.

Adulthood 
A stomach ailment that Rizzo had from 1939 continued to cause severe abdominal pain, despite the extensive medical treatment she received. Her mother took her to Rhoda Wise who was hailed as a mystic and stigmatic and "who claimed to receive visions of St Thérèse of Lisieux." Wise instructed Rizzo to pray a novena (a nine-day course of prayers) and made the girl promise that she would spread devotion to the saint if she was cured.

On January 17, 1943, following the novena's final day, Rizzo declared that she woke up with little pain and the abdominal lump causing it had vanished. This experience profoundly touched her; she believed that God had performed a miracle and she traced her lifelong commitment to God to this event. She later told an interviewer "[at that point] I knew that God knew me and loved me and was interested in me. All I wanted to do after my healing was give myself to Jesus."

One evening in 1944, Rizzo stopped at a church to pray and felt that God was calling her to be a nun. She sought guidance from a local parish priest who encouraged her to begin visiting convents. Her first visit was to the Sisters of St. Joseph in Buffalo, New York, but the active congregation felt that she was better suited to contemplative life. She also visited Saint Paul's Shrine of Perpetual Adoration, a facility operated by an order of cloistered contemplative nuns, located in Cleveland, Ohio. When visiting this order, she felt as if she were at home. The order accepted her as a postulant, inviting her to enter on August 15, 1944. She was 21 years old.

On November 8, 1945, Rizzo was vested as a Poor Clare nun. She received a new name, which her Mother Superior had chosen for her, and title, "Sister Mary Angelica of the Annunciation". Soon afterwards, the Cleveland monastery established a new monastery in her home town of Canton and she moved there.

In 1946, as a young nun, Angelica had an accident with an industrial floor-scrubbing machine that knocked her over and injured her spine, causing her ongoing pain and requiring her to wear leg braces for most of her life. Angelica saw the accident as a divine sign and promised Jesus to build a new monastery deep in the Protestant-dominated Southern United States if she recovered.

After nearly three years in the monastery, Angelica made her first profession of vows on January 2, 1947. On  1953, she made her solemn profession of vows at Sancta Clara Monastery in Ohio.

Our Lady of the Angels 
While at Sancta Clara, Angelica was inspired to create a religious community which would appeal to African Americans in the southern states and began to seek support. In 1957, Archbishop Thomas Toolen suggested that she open this community in Birmingham. With a number of other Poor Clare nuns she worked to raise the necessary funds, partially from a small business venture making and selling fishing lures. In 1961, the nuns bought a building and land, and in 1962, the community was officially established. It was named Our Lady of the Angels Monastery and located in Irondale, Alabama. Later it was relocated to the grounds of the Shrine of the Most Blessed Sacrament. The subject experienced the Baptism of the Holy Spirit which a Birmingham priest associated with the charismatic movement had told her about, which resulted in a new understanding of the Holy Spirit.

Shrine of the Most Blessed Sacrament 

In 1995, Angelica visited Colombia, where she had a vision that told her to build a temple in honor of the Child Jesus. Private donors contributed $48.6 million and she opened the Shrine of the Most Blessed Sacrament in Hanceville in 1999.

EWTN 
In 1962, Angelica began a series of community meetings on matters relevant to Catholicism and also began recording her talks for sale. Bishop Joseph Vath noticed her talent for communicating with the lay public and encouraged her to continue; she began taping a radio show for broadcast on Sunday mornings and published her first book in 1972. In the late 1970s she began videotaping her talks for television, which were broadcast on the satellite Christian Broadcasting Network. In 1981, after visiting a Chicago television studio and being impressed by its capability, she formed the non-profit EWTN corporation. Initially, she recorded her shows in a converted garage on the monastery's property.

EWTN became a voice for American conservatism and traditional Catholics, with its position on religious and social issues often mirroring that of Pope John Paul II. Angelica's emphasis on tradition led to feuds with some members of the Roman Catholic hierarchy. Most famous is the feud over a pastoral letter written by Cardinal Roger Mahony of the Archdiocese of Los Angeles over teachings surrounding the Eucharist and the liturgy.

The largest Roman Catholic television network in the world, EWTN estimates the network's channels reach 264 million households globally.

WEWN 
On December 28, 1992, Angelica launched a radio network, WEWN, which is carried by 215 stations, as well as on shortwave.

Later years 
On November 12, 1997, Angelica, on her Mother Angelica Live show, called on the faithful under Cardinal Roger Mahony to disobey the cardinal's Guide for Sunday Mass, saying "I'm afraid my obedience in that diocese would be absolutely zero, and I hope everybody else's in that diocese is zero." On November 18, Angelica apologized.

In the late 1990s, her EWTN show was so popular that she occasionally was the victim of live, call-in pranks by Captain Janks which were aired on The Howard Stern Show. Most of these calls were of a vulgar, sexual nature, but she handled them with her usual stern, but forgiving candor.

Angelica stepped down from control of EWTN in 2000 and handed control to a board of lay people. In 2001 she had one of several strokes.

Illness and death 
Angelica returned to taping her show twice a week on September 25, 2001. On Christmas Eve, she suffered another stroke and underwent a thrombectomy to remove a blood clot, a procedure that resulted in improvement of her vision. The stroke caused partial paralysis of the right side of her body and affected her speech. She began speech therapy and stopped hosting television programs. As her health declined, fellow sisters of her order in Hanceville began providing her with constant care.

On October 4, 2009, Angelica and Deacon Bill Steltemeier, then chairman of EWTN's board of governors, received the papal medal (Pro Ecclesia et Pontifice) from Pope Benedict XVI for their distinguished service to the Catholic Church. Because of her ill health, Angelica received the award in her room. Bishop Robert J. Baker of the Diocese of Birmingham said: "Mother Angelica's effort has been at the vanguard of the new evangelization and has had a great impact on our world."

In early December 2015, Angelica was placed on a feeding tube. A representative for her order explained, "It's not that she's completely unable to eat. It's assisting her to get the nutrients she needs." He added that she had experienced "some up and downs the last few months. She's a fighter." Although Angelica was confined to her bed, a representative said that she was "able to communicate with a squeeze of a hand, make gestures with her eyes. She acknowledges people when they're there. The nuns say she does sleep a lot." The use of a feeding tube was in accord with the wishes she made before her stroke in 2001 – a reporter recalled her saying: "We don't understand the awesomeness of living even one more day... I told my sisters the other day, 'When I get really bad give me all the medicine I can take, all the tubes you can stuff down me. ... I want to live. ... Because I will have suffered one more day for the love of God... I will exercise you in virtue. But most of all I will know God better. You cannot measure the value of one new thought about God in your own life.'"

In early February 2016 Pope Francis, while en route to Cuba, recorded a message for Angelica, saying: "To Mother Angelica with my blessing and I ask you to pray for me; I need it. God bless you Mother Angelica." Near the end of that month, her fellow nuns at Our Lady of Angels Monastery called for prayers on her behalf saying that "Mother's condition remains delicate and she receives devoted care day and night by her sisters and nurses. In God's Providence, she was able to receive the special Jubilee grace of passing through the Holy Door shortly after its opening. Although she is most often sleeping, from time to time Mother will give a radiant smile. ... Please continue to keep her in your prayers; each day is a gift!"

Angelica remained living at the monastery until her death on March 27, 2016 (Easter Sunday), at the age of 92 from complications due to the stroke she had 14 years prior. At the time, she "also suffered from Bell's palsy, heart disease and asthma."

Angelica held the Catholic belief in redemptive suffering, the belief human suffering can become meritorious if offered to Jesus Christ and mystically united with his suffering. Because of this belief, in her period of declining health Angelica "instructed her nuns to do everything to keep her alive, no matter how much she suffered, because every day she suffered, she suffered for God." EWTN chaplain Joseph Mary Wolfe told reporters that Angelica's desire to unite with Jesus in suffering was fulfilled when she "went into her death throes on Good Friday".

Wolfe recalled that "Mother began to cry out early in the morning from the pain that she was having. She had a fracture in her bones because of the length of time she had been bedridden. They said you could hear it down the hallways, that she was crying out on Good Friday from what she was going through. These two people [a caregiver and one of the sisters of her order] said to me she has excruciating pain." Wolfe said that "After the 3 o'clock hour arrived on Good Friday she was more calm, she was more peaceful." By 5:30 a.m. on Easter Sunday, Wolfe was contacted by Mother Delores who told him that Angelica "was really struggling, she wasn't doing very well." Wolfe went to her bedside to administer the Catholic last rites with the sisters of her order in attendance. The sisters prayed their morning prayers, the Divine Office, around her bed. As it was Easter, the prayer was liturgically required to contain Alleluias, which are usually not contained in the office for the dead – a fact that Wolfe felt had significance. Around 10:30 a.m., Father Paschal offered Mass in her room and she received her last communion (Viaticum). She died shortly before 5:00 p.m.

Tributes 
Sean O. Sheridan, the former president of the Franciscan University of Steubenville where Angelica received an honorary doctorate of sacred theology, described her as "a true media giant. She proved that the Church belonged in the popular media alongside the news, sports, and talk shows". Mark Evans of Deadline wrote, "Though her stances were decidedly old-school – she was critical of religious and political progressives – her lectures were lightened with an often self-deprecating humor. She famously said the nuns she remembered from her youth were 'the meanest people on God's earth.'"

On March 30, 2016, at a general audience in St. Peter's Square, Rome, an employee of EWTN held up a portrait of Angelica and Pope Francis responded to the display by saying "she's in Heaven".

In a ceremony on March 29, 2016, Angelica's body was brought to the Our Lady of the Angels Monastery for private visitation by the Poor Clare nuns. Public visitation occurred at the upper church of the Shrine of the Most Blessed Sacrament on March 30–31. The Mass of Christian Burial at the shrine's upper church took place on April 1 with the Archbishop of Philadelphia and EWTN board member Charles J. Chaput serving as principal celebrant and the EWTN chaplain Joseph Mary Wolfe as the homilist. Robert J. Baker and David E. Foley, the current and emeritus Bishops of Birmingham (where both EWTN and Our Lady of the Angels Monastery are located), respectively, concelebrated the Mass, along with Archbishop Thomas J. Rodi of Mobile (whose ecclesiastical province includes the Diocese of Birmingham), Bishop Thomas Olmsted of Phoenix, Bishop Richard F. Stika of Knoxville, and Archbishop Carlo Maria Viganò, the Apostolic Nuncio to the United States, who delivered a message from Pope Francis. In addition, many priests, deacons, religious, and seminarians were in attendance. This was followed by the rite of committal at the shrine's crypt chapel. All the funeral rites were televised on EWTN.

Cause for canonization 
After Angelica's death in 2016, there were calls from many for her to be canonized. Catholic Church rules dictate that a person's cause for sainthood cannot begin until five years after the person has died. As of September 2022, there has been no announcement from the Diocese of Birmingham whether a petition will be sent to Rome to begin a cause for her canonization.

References

Bibliography

External links 
 EWTN: Mother Angelica Official Dedication Site
 YouTube: Bishop Robert Barron on Mother Angelica
 YouTube / EWTN: Mother Angelica Live Classics
 IMDb: Mother Angelica’s biography 

1923 births
2016 deaths
American people of Italian descent
20th-century American Roman Catholic nuns
American television company founders
American television hosts
American television evangelists
People from Hanceville, Alabama
People from Canton, Ohio
Poor Clares
Religious leaders from Alabama
Religious leaders from Ohio
Roman Catholic activists
Roman Catholic writers
American women company founders
American company founders
Writers from Alabama
Writers from Ohio
American anti-abortion activists
Catholics from Ohio
Catholics from Alabama
American women television presenters
21st-century venerated Christians
21st-century American Roman Catholic nuns